Hypericum galioides, the bedstraw St. Johnswort, is a species of flowering plant in the St. John's wort family, Hypericaceae. It is endemic to the Southeastern United States.

Description
The flowers are small, in terminal and axillary cymes, with very narrow sepals. It flowers in the summer, between June and August.

Distribution and habitat
Hypericum galioides occurs in wet to moist habitats in the coastal plain of the southeastern United States. It has been recorded from North Carolina south to northern Florida and west to the eastern parts of Texas, but excluding most of the Mississippi delta. Habitat types include streambanks, swamps, river bottoms, floodplains, lake edges, wet pine forests, and ditches.

References

galioides
Flora of the Southeastern United States
Flora of the South-Central United States
Taxa named by Jean-Baptiste Lamarck
Flora without expected TNC conservation status